Henri Avagyan (born 16 January 1996) is an Armenian footballer who plays as a goalkeeper for Pyunik and the Armenia national team.

Career

Club
On 5 August 2020, Avagyan signed for FC Van.

On 28 December 2022, FC Pyunik announced the signing of Avagyan.

International
Avagyan made his international debut for Armenia on 19 November 2018, starting in the 2018–19 UEFA Nations League D match against Liechtenstein, which finished as a 2–2 away draw.

Career statistics

International

References

External links
 
 

1996 births
Living people
Footballers from Yerevan
Armenian footballers
Armenia youth international footballers
Armenia under-21 international footballers
Armenia international footballers
Association football goalkeepers
FC Mika players
FC Urartu players
FC Alashkert players
FC Pyunik players
Armenian Premier League players